Prionapteryx albimaculalis is a moth in the family Crambidae. It was described by George Hampson in 1919. It is found in Namibia, South Africa and Zimbabwe.

References

Ancylolomiini
Moths described in 1919
Moths of Africa